is a railway station on the AbukumaExpress in the city of Date, Fukushima Japan.

Lines

Station layout
Ōizumi Station has one side platform serving a single bi-directional track. There is no station building. The station is unattended.

Adjacent stations

History
Ōizumi Station opened on July 1, 1988.

Passenger statistics
In fiscal 2015, the station was used by an average of 270 passengers daily (boarding passengers only).

Surrounding area
Date City Hall
Former Kameoka Family Home

See also
 List of Railway Stations in Japan

References

External links

  Abukuma Express home page 

Railway stations in Fukushima Prefecture
Abukuma Express Line
Railway stations in Japan opened in 1988
Date, Fukushima